The North Western Road Car Company was a bus company in Stockport, England, formed in 1923 from the existing bus services of the British Automobile Traction Company Limited (itself a subsidiary of the British Electric Traction Company Limited) in Macclesfield. The company operated bus services in five counties (Cheshire, Lancashire, West Riding of Yorkshire, Derbyshire and Staffordshire) through a combination of growth and the acquisition of other bus companies, such as the takeover in 1924 of the Mid-Cheshire Motor Bus Company Limited, which brought new operations in Northwich and Flixton. The company also operated express coach services to London, North Wales and Yorkshire.

North Western had garages in:
 Altrincham: Oakfield Street
 Biddulph: Whalley Street
 Buxton: Bridge Street
Castleton, Back Street open till at least 1967
 Glossop: York Street
 Macclesfield: Sunderland Street
 Manchester: Hulme Hall Road
 Matlock: Bakewell Road
 Northwich: Chester Way
 Oldham: Clegg Street
 Stockport: Charles Street
 Urmston: Higher Road
 Wilmslow: Church Street

The company later became part of the National Bus Company, which eventually split it between its neighbouring subsidiaries; its depots in Stockport, Oldham, Glossop, Altrincham and Urmston areas were transferred to the SELNEC PTE in 1972. The remaining depots and services in Cheshire were transferred to Crosville, however the services originating from Warrington, to Altrincham on the direct route service 37 via Lymm Church and the indirect route service 38 via Dunham Massey, and the route to Urmston, service 42, were jointly licensed with Warrington Corporation. In practice Warrington only operated jointly with Crosville on the 37. Warrington Corporation had enjoyed a good relationship with North Western and the municipality's Wilderspool Causeway depot provided an outstation for two North Western buses, a driver and two conductors, who came under the company's depot at Northwich. Crosville exclusively ran the 38 and 42, largely because these less frequent services were interworked and required specially adapted single decker buses to cope with the low height canal bridge at Dunham Massey on the 38. The buses in question had been transferred from Selnec Cheshire Bus Company to Crosville's Warrington depot for this purpose. The depots in Buxton and Matlock were transferred to Trent Motor Traction. North Western kept hold of its Manchester depot for its remaining express coach services, but the company was renamed as National Travel (North West) Limited in 1974.

See also
List of bus operators of the United Kingdom

References 
 Ogden, Eric. (1980) North Western: V. 1, The Transport Publishing Company.

External links 

History of North Western Road Car Company 1923-1974

Former bus operators in Greater Manchester
Former bus operators in Cheshire
Former bus operators in Lancashire
Former bus operators in West Yorkshire
Former bus operators in Derbyshire
Former bus operators in Staffordshire
Transport companies established in 1923
1923 establishments in England